Cankilian Thoppu facade or Poothathamby arch, simply known as Cankilian Thoppu, is an ancient facade, and one of the remnants of the Jaffna kingdom. The arch is located on the Jaffna-Point Pedro Road, near Nallur, Jaffna. The Cankilian Thoppu is an archaeological protected monument in the Jaffna District and was listed as such by the Sri Lankan government in 2007.

It is situated close to other physical remnants of the Jaffna kingdom and is believed to be part of the facade of the king's palace, even though its architecture style is typical of Dutch colonial architecture. The Cankilian Thoppu is located within the area known as the Pandiya Palace, which supports the connection with the Tamil kings and their kingdom.

See also 

 Jaffna Palace ruins

References

Bibliography
 

Archaeological
Buildings and structures in Jaffna
Jaffna kingdom
Archaeological protected monuments in Jaffna District